Dean Benson Phillips (born January 20, 1969) is an American businessman and politician who has served as the U.S. representative from Minnesota's 3rd congressional district since 2019. The district encompasses the western suburbs of the Twin Cities, such as Bloomington, Minnetonka, Edina, Maple Grove, Plymouth, and Eden Prairie. Phillips is a member of the Democratic Party.

Phillips has both owned and started several companies in addition to serving as president and CEO of his family’s liquor business, the Phillips Distilling Company. He is the former co-owner of Talenti gelato and co-owns Penny's Coffee.

First elected in 2018, Phillips defeated six-term Republican incumbent Erik Paulsen. By flipping the once staunchly Republican district, he became the first Democrat to win the seat since 1958. He has since been reelected twice. Phillips is considered a centrist and a moderate Democrat. Working alongside Republicans on multiple issues, he has been consistently ranked as one of the most bipartisan members of Congress. Phillips advocates for fiscal responsibility, public safety, environmental protection, and healthcare reform. With a net worth of $77 million in 2018, Phillips is one of the wealthiest members of Congress.

Early life, education, and career 
Phillips was born to DeeDee (Cohen) and Artie Pfefer in Saint Paul, Minnesota, in 1969. Artie was killed in the Vietnam War when Phillips was six months old. DeeDee later married Eddie Phillips, heir to the Phillips Distilling Company and the son of advice columnist Pauline Phillips.

In the early 1970s, Phillips moved from Saint Paul to Edina, Minnesota. He attended The Blake School, where he played on the hockey and baseball teams.

Phillips graduated from Brown University in 1991 and is a member of the Sigma Chi fraternity. He worked for bicycle equipment and apparel company InMotion for two years, and then joined his family's company's corporate office. He later completed his Master of Business Administration at the University of Minnesota's Carlson School of Management in 2000. After graduation, he was named the president and CEO of his family's organization, Phillips Distilling.

Phillips served as the company's president and CEO from 2000 to 2012. He then stepped aside to run one of his other corporate investments, Talenti gelato, until it was sold for an undisclosed amount to Unilever in 2014. Since 2016, he has been the founder and owner of Penny's Coffee, a coffeeshop chain with two locations in the Minneapolis–Saint Paul metropolitan area as of 2022.

U.S. House of Representatives

Elections

2018 

In the Democratic primary, he defeated former sales associate Cole Young with 81.6% of the vote. Phillips won all three counties in the district.

In the general election, Phillips defeated incumbent Republican Erik Paulsen with 55.6% of the vote. When he took office in 2019, he became the first Democrat to hold this seat since 1961.

2020 

Phillips ran for reelection in 2020. He defeated Cole Young in the Democratic primary with 90.7% of the vote and faced off against the Republican nominee, businessman Kendall Qualls. Phillips defeated Qualls with 55.6% of the vote.

2022 
Phillips was unopposed in the Democratic primary. In the general election, he defeated the Republican nominee, retired U.S. Navy submarine officer Tom Weiler, with 60% of the vote.

Tenure 
According to FiveThirtyEights congressional vote tracker at ABC News, Phillips voted with President Joe Biden's stated public policy positions 100% of the time, making him more liberal than average in the 117th Congress when predictive scoring (district partisanship and voting record) is used. During the start of his first term in 2019, the McCourt School of Public Policy at Georgetown University placed him 27th out of 435 members in terms of bipartisanship.

Committee assignments 
 Committee on Financial Services
 Subcommittee on Diversity and Inclusion
 Subcommittee on Oversight and Investigations
 Committee on Foreign Affairs
 Subcommittee on Africa, Global Health, Global Human Rights and International Organizations
 Subcommittee on the Western Hemisphere, Civilian Security and Trade
 House Committee on Ethics
 Select Committee on the Modernization of Congress

Caucus memberships 
 Congressional LGBT Equality Caucus
New Democrat Coalition
 Problem Solvers Caucus

Electoral history

Personal life
Phillips is married and has two daughters from a previous marriage. He is Jewish and was acknowledged by the Minnesota publication The American Jewish World for serving on the board of Temple Israel in Minneapolis.

Phillips's paternal grandmother Pauline Phillips was the author of the advice column "Dear Abby," under the pen name Abigail Van Buren.

References

External links

 Congressman Dean Phillips official U.S. House website
 Campaign website

 

|-

1969 births
Brown University alumni
Businesspeople from Saint Paul, Minnesota
Democratic Party members of the United States House of Representatives from Minnesota
Jewish members of the United States House of Representatives
Living people
Politicians from Saint Paul, Minnesota
Carlson School of Management alumni
21st-century American Jews
American Jews from Minnesota